York Township is one of the twelve townships of Sandusky County, Ohio, United States.  As of the 2000 census, 2,512 people lived in the township.

Geography
Located in the southeastern corner of the county, it borders the following townships:
Townsend Township - north
Groton Township, Erie County - northeast
Lyme Township, Huron County - southeast
Thompson Township, Seneca County - south
Adams Township, Seneca County - southwest corner
Green Creek Township - west
Riley Township - northwest corner

Parts of two cities are located in York Township: Bellevue in the southeast, and Clyde in the west.

Name and history
It is one of ten York Townships statewide.

Government
The township is governed by a three-member board of trustees, who are elected in November of odd-numbered years to a four-year term beginning on the following January 1. Two are elected in the year after the presidential election and one is elected in the year before it. There is also an elected township fiscal officer, who serves a four-year term beginning on April 1 of the year after the election, which is held in November of the year before the presidential election. Vacancies in the fiscal officership or on the board of trustees are filled by the remaining trustees.

Notable people
George W. Norris, U.S. Senator from Nebraska

References

External links
County website

Townships in Sandusky County, Ohio
Townships in Ohio